Ungmennafélagið Fjölnir, commonly known as Fjölnir, is a multi-sport club from Iceland. The club is located in Grafarvogur, Reykjavík. A total of nine sports are practised at the club: football, basketball, handball, taekwondo, karate, tennis, swimming, athletics and gymnastics. Chess is also played at the club. Each one of these sports has their own department with their own board but all are under the main board and the club office.

Football

Men's football

Current squad

Out on loan

Trophies and achievements
1. deild karla (1):
2013

Basketball

Men's basketball

Trophies and achievements
Icelandic Second Division:
2001–02

Women's basketball

Trophies and achievements
Division I (2):
2007, 2010

Ice hockey
On 28 September 2018, Skautafélagið Björninn merged into Fjölnir who overtook all its departments, assets and debts.

References

External links 

Official website 
 KKÍ: Fjölnir – kki.is

 
Football clubs in Iceland
Football clubs in Reykjavík
Multi-sport clubs in Iceland
Sports clubs established in 1988
Sport in Reykjavík
1988 establishments in Iceland
Ice hockey teams in Iceland
Ice hockey clubs established in 1990
Icelandic Hockey League